Gottardi is an Italian surname. Notable people with the surname include:

 Donata Gottardi, Italian politician
 Eduardo Gottardi, Brazilian footballer
 Giovanni Gottardi, Italian painter
 Gottardo Gottardi, Swiss chess player
 Guerino Gottardi, Italian footballer
 Hugo Gottardi, Argentine footballer and coach
 Jefferson Gottardi, Bolivian footballer
 José Gottardi, Uruguayan Archbishop
 Roberto Gottardi, Italian-Cuban architect
 Vittore Gottardi (1941–2015), Swiss footballer
 Vittorio Gottardi (born 18 March 1967), Swiss footballer

Italian-language surnames